Macky Frank Bagnack Mouegni (born 7 June 1995) is a Cameroonian professional footballer who plays for Russian club Pari NN on loan from Kairat.

Club career

Born in Yaoundé, Bagnack came to FC Barcelona in 2008, through the Samuel Eto'o Foundation at the age of 13. He was promoted to the reserves on 3 August 2012.

Bagnack made his professional debut on 8 September 2012, replacing Kiko Femenía in the 75th minute of a 1–0 away win against CD Guadalajara in the Segunda División. However, it was his maiden appearance of the campaign.

Bagnack profited from David Lombán and Marc Muniesa's departures in 2013–14, appearing in 24 matches. He renewed his link with the Catalans on 28 January 2014, running until 2017, and scored his first goal on 7 June, netting the second of a 2–1 away win against Hércules CF.

In the 2014–15 season, Bagnack received eleven yellow cards and one red in a campaign which saw his team relegated to Segunda División B, his expulsion coming in a 1–0 loss at Real Betis on 8 November. On 12 January 2016, he rescinded his contract with Barça, and signed for FC Nantes shortly after.

On 31 August 2016, Bagnack returned to Spain after signing a one-year deal with Real Zaragoza.

In 2018, Bagnack signed a contract with the Slovenian Olimpia Ljubljana, where he spent two successful seasons.

On 27 July 2020, Bagnack signed a three-year contract with Partizan.

In July 2021, the footballer signed a contract with FC Kairat in Kazakhstan until December 2023.

On 31 January 2023, Bagnack joined Pari NN on loan until June 2023, with an option to make the move permanent.

International career
After appearing with Cameroon under-20's, Bagnack was named in the senior squad for the 2015 Africa Cup of Nations. On 7 January 2015, he made his debut for Cameroon in a friendly against DR Congo. He came in as a half-time substitute, replacing Raoul Loé and playing the entire second half.

In August 2017, he was part of the Cameroon U23 team playing at the 2017 Islamic Solidarity Games held in Baku, Azerbaijan.

Career statistics

Club

International

References

External links
 
 
 
 

1995 births
Living people
Footballers from Yaoundé
Cameroonian footballers
Association football defenders
Cameroon international footballers
Cameroon under-20 international footballers
2015 Africa Cup of Nations players
Segunda División players
Championnat National 2 players
Austrian Football Bundesliga players
Slovenian PrvaLiga players
Serbian SuperLiga players
Kazakhstan Premier League players
FC Barcelona Atlètic players
Real Zaragoza players
FC Nantes players
FC Admira Wacker Mödling players
NK Olimpija Ljubljana (2005) players
FK Partizan players
FC Kairat players
FC Nizhny Novgorod (2015) players
Cameroonian expatriate footballers
Cameroonian expatriate sportspeople in Spain
Expatriate footballers in Spain
Cameroonian expatriate sportspeople in France
Expatriate footballers in France
Cameroonian expatriate sportspeople in Austria
Expatriate footballers in Austria
Cameroonian expatriate sportspeople in Slovenia
Expatriate footballers in Slovenia
Cameroonian expatriate sportspeople in Serbia
Expatriate footballers in Serbia
Cameroonian expatriate sportspeople in Kazakhstan
Expatriate footballers in Kazakhstan
Cameroonian expatriate sportspeople in Russia
Expatriate footballers in Russia